Kerala United Theological Seminary (KUTS) is run by the Church of South India with an ecumenical outlook. It was founded in 1943, and is affiliated to the Senate of Serampore College (University), West Bengal. KUTS is located in Kannammoola in Thiruvananthapuram, Kerala. Now the seminary is run by six Dioceses in Kerala - South Kerala, Central Kerala, East Kerala, Kochin, Kollam-Kottarakkara and Malabar Diocese.

Courses offered
KUTS offers the degrees in following courses through the Senate of Serampore College.
Integrated Bachelor of Divinity (I. B. D.)
Bachelor of Divinity (B.Div.)
 Master of Ministry (M.Min.) 
 Doctor of Ministry (D.Min.)

KUTS is also a participating member in the Federated Faculty for Research in Religion and Culture (FFRRC) through which it offers two post-graduate courses: Master of Theology (Th.M.) and Doctor of Theology (Th.D.).

References

External links
Kerala United Theological Seminary

Christian seminaries and theological colleges in India
Seminaries and theological colleges in India
Colleges in Thiruvananthapuram
Educational institutions established in 1943
Reformed church seminaries and theological colleges
Anglican seminaries and theological colleges
Seminaries and theological colleges affiliated to the Senate of Serampore College (University)
1943 establishments in India